Gébler is a surname. Notable people with the surname include:

Carlo Gébler (born 1954), Irish writer, television director, and teacher
Ernest Gébler (1914–1998), Irish writer